Aloosa or Aaloosa is a Town located in Bandipora tehsil of Bandipora district, Jammu and Kashmir, India. The village has a total population of 11044, of which 5629 are males while 5415 are females as per Population Census 2011.

Aloosa village is located down the hills of the Nagamarg mountain range and near banks of Wullar Lake.
8 km away from the main town Bandipora, Aloosa has a rich history in the struggle against oppression.
Aloosa village was given Tehsil status in 2014 by then JKNC government
Aloosa is unique in many ways from its adjoining villages
Aloosa has one higher secondary school, four main private schools.
Malik Sumeed a prominent journalist is from the same Village.

References 

Villages in Bandipora district